Edmonton-South West is a provincial electoral district in Edmonton, Alberta, Canada. The district was created in the 2010 boundary redistribution and is mandated to return a single member to the Legislative Assembly of Alberta using the first past the post voting system.

History
The electoral district was created in the 2010 Alberta boundary re-distribution. It was created from the south part of Edmonton-Whitemud below Anthony Henday Drive and the south and western portion of Edmonton-McClung along Anthony Henday as well.

Boundary history

Electoral history

The electoral district was created from the electoral districts of Edmonton-McClung and Whitemud. The area has had a recent history of switching between Progressive Conservative and Liberal candidates.

During the 2019 Alberta general election MLA Thomas Dang chose to run in Edmonton-South following the 2017 Electoral Boundary Re-distribution. UCP candidate Madu would defeat four candidates capturing 10,245 votes (45%), above the next closest candidate John Archer representing the NDP with 9,539 (42%).

Legislature results

2012 general election

2015 general election

2019 general election

References

External links
Elections Alberta

Alberta provincial electoral districts
Politics of Edmonton